Southwest Little Rock is a neighborhood in the southwestern area of Little Rock, Arkansas.  Since 2011 Southwest Little Rock has seen growth in small businesses, low crime rate (high violent crime rate), and expansion in minority families in at or below poverty level areas.

Southwest Little Rock is home to the largest Hispanic population in the city. Numerous Hispanic small businesses operate in the area and many Hispanic families call Southwest Little Rock home.

Notable people 
 Keith Jackson - Former professional American football tight end and color commentator on radio broadcasts for the Arkansas Razorbacks.
 Frank Scott Jr. - politician, current mayor of Little Rock

References

Neighborhoods in Little Rock, Arkansas